The Ministry of National Defense (MOD) is the government ministry responsible for the maintenance of the national defense and the governance of the military of Liberia, the Armed Forces of Liberia.

History
An amendment to the Liberian Constitution allowed the previously named War Department to be renamed the Department of National Defense on February 25, 1955. Then, during the early years of President William Tolbert's Administration after 1971, all departments were renamed Ministries and thus the organization became the Ministry of National Defense. Retired General Ziankahn remains the Minister of Defence.

List of ministers

Secretaries of War and the Navy (1848-1971) 

 Joseph Jenkins Roberts (1848-1876)
 Reginald A. Sherman (1876-1892)
 Colonel Anthony D. Williams, Jr. (1892-1900)
 George B. Padmore
 Robert T. Sherman
 Wilmot H. Dennis
 Columbus Harris
 Isaac Moart
 James F. Cooper
 B.W. Payne
 James W. Cooper
 Momolu Massaquoi
 Joseph Dennis
 Henry Reed Cooper
 J. Foulton Dunbar
 Wilkins Tyler
 Isaac Whisnant
 Ernest C.B. Jones
 Ernest J. Yancy
 Harrison Grisby
 Robert A. Brewer (c. 1967-1971)

Ministers of Defense (1971-present) 
 Everett Jonathan Goodridge
 Allen H. Williams 
 Harry A. Greaves (1976–1978)
 M. Burleigh Holder (1978–1979)
 James Y. Gbabee (1979–1980)
 Samuel Bennie Pearson (April 1980-1981)
 Albert Karpeh (1981-1982)
 Grey Dio-Glaye Allison (1982-August 1989)
 J. Boima Barclay (1989–9 September 1990 )
 J. Hezekiah Bowen (1995–1997)
 Daniel Chea (1997–2006), as National Transitional Government of Liberia Defense Minister 
 Brownie J. Samukai (2006–2017)
 Major General Daniel Ziankahn (since 22 January 2018)

Building 
The Ministry's three-story building used to be located on Benson Street in downtown Monrovia, but upon the conclusion of the DynCorp army training effort in Liberia, moved to the Barclay Training Center, also located in central Monrovia, in July 2009. In early August 2009 the Ministry's Comptroller was dismissed, apparently for misappropriating US$50,000 intended for paying soldiers of the rebuilt AFL.

See also
Politics of Liberia

References

M. Burleigh Holder, "The Hand of God," Xlibris Corporation, April 2006.

External links
Ministry of National Defense official site 
National Security Agency official site

National Defense
Military of Liberia
Liberia